Banach's match problem is a classic problem in probability attributed to Stefan Banach. Feller  says that the problem was inspired by a humorous reference to Banach's smoking habit in a speech honouring him by Hugo Steinhaus, but that it was not Banach who set the problem or provided an answer. 

Suppose a mathematician carries two matchboxes at all times: one in his left pocket and one in his right. Each time he needs a match, he is equally likely to take it from either pocket. Suppose he reaches into his pocket and discovers for the first time that the box picked is empty. If it is assumed that each of the matchboxes originally contained  matches, what is the probability that there are exactly  matches in the other box?

Solution

Without loss of generality consider the case where the matchbox in his right pocket has an unlimited number of matches and let  be the number of matches removed from this one before the left one is found to be empty. When the left pocket is found to be empty, the man has chosen that pocket  times.

.

We see that the number  of matches remaining in the other pocket is

.

(This is shown using Stirling's approximation.)

See also
List of things named after Stefan Banach

References

External links
 Java applet

Applied probability
Probability problems